Rao Yutai (December 1, 1891 – October 16, 1968) was a Chinese physicist, one of the founders of modern physics in China. He was a founding member of Academia Sinica in 1948 and of the Chinese Academy of Sciences in 1955.

Early years
Rao was born in Linchuan, Jiangxi, Qing Empire in December 1891. His father was a government officer in Qing Dynasty. He studied Chinese classical literature in childhood. In 1905, he went to study in a high school in Shanghai. Dr. Hu Shih taught his English.

University
In 1913, Rao went to study in the United States, sponsored by the government. He was first recruited to the University of California, and moved to the University of Chicago. He obtained his bachelor in physics in winter 1917. He enrolled in the graduate school at Harvard University in 1918. Later, he moved to Yale University and then Princeton University. He received his master's degree from Princeton in 1921, and his doctorate in 1922. His dissertation was on the emission efficiency of low-pressure electrical arcs, under the supervision of K.T. Compton.

He returned to China and was recruited to Nankai University, where he founded the department of physics and served as chair. His notable students include Wu Ta-You, Wu Daren, Yung-huai Kuo, Jiang Zehan, Ma Shijun, Shen Youzhen, Shiing-shen Chern and Zheng Huazhi.

Research Abroad
In 1929, Rao went to do research at the University of Leipzig in Germany. He returned in 1932 and became a fellow in the physics institute of the Peking Research Institute. He later became the chair of the physics department at Peking University, and was promoted to Dean of the school of science in 1935. He was the chair of the physics department at the National Southwestern Associated University during the Sino-Japanese War. From 1944 to 1947, he studied the molecular spectra in the United States, in collaboration with A. H. Nielsen.

In 1949, Rao chose to stay at Peking University, upon the establishment of the People's Republic of China. He continued to serve as dean and chair of physics until 1951. He was elected as member of the Chinese Academy of Sciences in 1955.

Persecution
Rao was severely persecuted in Cultural Revolution. He committed suicide on the University campus on October 16, 1968. He was posthumously rehabilitated in 1978.

Honors
In 2000, the Chinese Physical Society established five prizes, in recognition of five pioneers of modern physics in China. The  is awarded to physicists in Optics, Acoustics, Atomic and Molecular physics.

References

1891 births
1968 deaths
Educators from Jiangxi
Members of Academia Sinica
Members of the Chinese Academy of Sciences
Academic staff of Nankai University
Academic staff of the National Southwestern Associated University
People from Fuzhou, Jiangxi
Academic staff of Peking University
Physicists from Jiangxi
Suicides by hanging in China
Suicides during the Cultural Revolution
1968 suicides